Breweries in Idaho produce many different styles of beer.  Some breweries package their beer in bottles or cans for retail sale.  Some breweries produce kegs of beer, to be sold on draft at taverns and restaurants, or at the brewery's own tap room.  Brewpubs combine brewing operations with full-service restaurants.  Commercially licensed breweries use one or several of these methods to sell their products.

Since the turn of the century, the number of craft breweries in Idaho has increased significantly, reflecting a national trend.

Breweries

 10 Barrel Brewing Company – Brewpubs in Boise, Idaho, Bend, Oregon, and Portland, Oregon, production brewery and bottling line in Bend, opened in 2006
 Atmos Brewing Co., a subsidiary of Sawtooth brewery specializing in near-beer.
 Barbarian Brewing – Garden City, bottling line, tap room, opened in 2015
 Bear Island Brewing Company – Boise, opened in 2014
 Bella Brewing – Garden City, taproom, opened in 2016
 Bertram's Brewery – Salmon, brewpub, opened in 1998
 Boise Brewing – Boise, bottling line, taproom, opened in 2014
 Broken Horn Brewing Company – McCall, taproom, opened in 2013
 Cloud 9 Brewery – Boise, brewpub, opened 2014
 County Line Brewing – Garden City, taproom, opened in 2015
 Crescent Brewery – Nampa, taproom, opened in 2009
 Crooked Fence Brewing Company – Eagle, brewery with bottling, canning, and taproom, and second location with brewpub, opened in 2012
 Daft Badger Brewing – Coeur d'Alene, brewpub, opened in 2015
 Downdraft Brewing Company – Post Falls, taproom, opened in 2014
 Edge Brewing Company – Boise, bottling line and brewpub, opened in 2014
 Grand Teton Brewing – Victor, bottling line, taproom, opened in 1988; Idaho's oldest brewery
 Highlands Hollow Brewhouse – Boise, brewpub, opened in 1992; Boise's oldest brewery
 Idaho Brewing Company – Idaho Falls, taproom, opened in 2009
Kootenai River Brewing Company – Bonners Ferry, brewpub, opened in 2010
 Laughing Dog Brewery – Ponderay, bottling line, taproom, opened in 2005
 Mad Bomber Brewing Company – Hayden, taproom, opened in 2013
 McCall Brewing Company – McCall, bottling line and brewpub, opened in 1994
 MickDuff's Brewing Company – Sandpoint, brewpub, opened in 2006
 Moscow Brewing Company – Moscow, taproom, opened in 2013, closed in 2016, reopened under new ownership in 2017
Mother Earth Brewing Company – Nampa
 North Idaho Mountain Brew – Wallace, brewpub, opened in 2011
Paragon Brewing – Coeur d'Alene, brewpub, opened in 2013
 Payette Brewing Company – Boise, canning line, taproom, opened in 2010; Idaho's biggest brewery
 Portneuf Valley Brewing – Pocatello, brewpub, opened in 2002
 Post Falls Brewing Company – Post Falls, opened in 2016
 Powderhaus Brewing Company – Garden City, taproom, opened in 2015
 Ram Restaurant & Brewery – the company originated in Washington and now has more than 20 locations, including Boise and Meridian
Salmon River Brewery – McCall, brewpub, opened in 2008
 Sawtooth Brewery – Ketchum, brewpub, opened in 2011
 Selkirk Abbey Brewing Company – Post Falls, bottling line, taproom, opened in 2012
Slate Creek Brewing Company – Coeur d'Alene, taproom, opened in 2013
 Snow Eagle Brewing & Grill – Idaho Falls, brewpub, opened in 2012
 Sockeye Brewing – Boise, canning line, two brewpubs, founded in 1996
 Sun Valley Brewing Company – Hailey, brewpub, opened in 1996
 Trestle Brewing Company – Ferdinand, taproom, opened in 2014
 Tricksters Brewing Company – Coeur d'Alene, bottling line, taproom, opened in 2012
 Von Scheidt Brewing Company – Twin Falls, taproom, founded in 2009
 Wallace Brewing Company – Wallace, bottling line, taproom, opened in 2008
 Warfield Distillery & Brewery – Ketchum, brewpub, opened in 2015
Western Collective – Garden City, taproom, opened in 2018
 White Dog Brewing White Dog Brewing - Boise (Opened Sept 2017)
 Wildlife Brewing Company – Victor, brewpub, opened in 2003
 Wolftrack Brewing and Tasting Den – Cottonwood, taproom, opened in 2013
 Woodland Empire Ale Craft – Boise, bottling line, taproom, opened in 2014

Closed breweries
 BiPlane Brewing Company – Post Falls
 Brownstone Restaurant & Brewhouse – Idaho Falls
 Coeur d'Alene Brewing Company – Coeur d'Alene
 Haff Brewing – Garden City
 Hollister Mountain Brewing Company – Coeur d'Alene
 Kilted Dragon Brewing – Garden City
 M.J. Barleyhoppers – Lewiston
PostModern Brewers – Boise
 Slanted Rock Brewing Company – Meridian
 Snake River Brewing Company – Caldwell
 TableRock Brewpub & Grill – Boise
 Trail Creek Brewing Company – Twin Falls

See also

 List of wineries in Idaho

References

External links
Idaho Brewers United
Idaho Department of Agriculture

Breweries
Idaho
Breweries
Food and drink in Idaho